Manpo Airport(만포비행장) is an airport near Manpo, Chagang Province, North Korea.

Facilities 
The airfield has a single grass runway 03/21 measuring 7850 x 174 feet (2393 x 53 m).  The northern half of the runway is bordered by earth aircraft revetments.  It is only a few miles from the border with China. During the Korean War, the USAF designated this airfield as K-32 and Oesichon-dong.

References 

Airports in North Korea
Buildings and structures in Chagang Province
Korean War air bases